The Kenyan Super Cup is a Kenyan football championship contested by the winners of the Kenyan Premier League and the FKF President's Cup. Having been formed in 2009, it is the Kenyan equivalent to the FA Community Shield of England, which is competed for by the winners of the Premier League and the FA Cup.

The first winners of the cup were Gor Mahia, who beat Mathare United 3–0 to lift the trophy in 2009.

Winners

By year

By number of wins (clubs)

Notes
 1  – Tusker will play Gor Mahia as the 2013 KPL Top 8 Cup champions.

 A  – Score was 1–1 after 90 minutes. Tusker won the shoot-out 4–1.
 B  – Score was 0–0 after 90 minutes. Gor Mahia won the shoot-out 5–4.
 C  – Score was 1–1 after 90 minutes. Tusker won the shoot-out 5–3.
 D  – Score was 1–1 after 90 minutes. Tusker won the shoot-out 8–7.

References

 
Super Cup
National association football supercups